Mannings, Saint Kitts and Nevis is a small town on the island of Nevis in Saint Kitts and Nevis. It is the easternmost settlement in the country.

Populated places in Saint Kitts and Nevis